Brøndby Strand (in English: 'Well Town' Beach) is a suburb in Brøndby Municipality, approximately  south-west of central Copenhagen, Denmark

Overview
Brøndby Strand contains a large housing project, in which 8,000 of the suburb's 11,000 inhabitants live. The area is known for having various social problems: many of the inhabitants are unemployed. Of the total population, 60% are immigrants or Danes with immigrant parents, most of whom live in the housing projects. It contains about a dozen high-rise residential estates of a big multicultural mix, and is home to a number of successful hip hop and urban rap artists of national and international stature. The suburb is connected with the S-train.

Notable people

Music 

 Majid (born 1975) a Danish rapper of Moroccan-Berber origin
 Burhan Genç Koç (born 1983) known as Burhan G, a Danish R&B and pop singer, songwriter and producer 
 Sivas Torbati (born ca. 1990) known as Sivas a Danish rapper of Iranian origin
 Outlandish (1997-2017) a hip-hop music group

Sport 
 Nicholas Gotfredsen (born 1989) a Danish footballer, plays for Hobro IK
 Jesper Lindstrøm (born 2000) a Danish footballer, plays for Eintracht Frankfurt

See also
Brøndbyvester
Brøndbyøster
Brøndby Strand station

References

 https://web.archive.org/web/20080226094728/http://www.brondby.dk/Hovedmenu/By%2C%20bolig%20og%20trafik/Byplanlaegning/Lokalplaner%20Br%C3%B8ndby%20strand.aspx

Neighbourhoods in Denmark
Copenhagen metropolitan area
Brøndby Municipality